West Reading may refer to:

West Reading, Berkshire, a district of the English town of Reading
West Reading, Pennsylvania, a borough in the US state of Pennsylvania

See also
 Reading West (disambiguation)